The 1954 Constitution of the People's Republic of China was adopted and enacted on September 20, 1954, through the first session of the First National People’s Congress in Beijing.

Introduction  
This constitution was published based upon 2 documents: one is “The Common Program of the Chinese People's Political Consultative Conference (CPCPCC)”, and the other one is “The Organic Law of the Central People's Government of the People's Republic of China”. The Constitution of 1954 was the first constitution of socialism in China. In the constitution of 1954, it includes the Preamble, four chapters, 106 articles, and it defines “the national flag of People’s Republic of China is a red flag with 5 stars” (Art 104); “the national emblem of the People’s Republic of China is: in the centre, Tien An Men under the light of five stars, and encircled by ears of grain and a cogwheel.” (Art 105); and “the capital of People’s Republic of China is Peking (Beijing).” (Art 106). During the development of socialism, the Constitution of 1954 stipulated the task for the ongoing Chinese Communist state. Compared with the Constitution of 1949, the constitution of 1954 narrowed the definition of the regime in China. Under this situation, China finally became a Communist country. 
 
On the eve of the Cultural Revolution, Liu Shaoqi, then the PRC President, fell victim to the Constitution itself. Although constitutionally Liu could not be removed, since the force of the dawning Cultural Revolution was too great, and Liu had to leave the Presidency behind.

The 1954 Constitution was replaced in the midst of the Cultural Revolution by the 1975 Constitution of the People's Republic of China. Books published in the PRC since the 1980s regarded the 1975 and 1978 promulgations of the Constitutions as ones with "serious errors". In the 1954 Constitution, the President of the People's Republic of China (PRC) could convene Supreme National Meetings—emergency meetings. This Presidential right was never seen again in later promulgations of the Chinese constitution.

Summary of the constitution of 1954 
The first chapter in the Constitution of 1954 includes 20 articles and it deals with the general issue of defining social and economic structure. In the first chapter, it gave the primary definition of “the nature of regime, the structure of ownership, people’s property rights and so on.” Heavily considering the state of the country at the time, the first part of the constitution emphasized the equality between the Han nationality and the other fifty-six minority nationalities.

The second chapter consists of 64 articles; this part stipulated the relationship between “the national people’s congress (NPC), Chairman of China, State Council, and the local people’s congress, the local people’s councils” with “the Organs of self-government of National Autonomous Areas, the people’s courts and the people’s Procuratorates”.

The third chapter indicates rights and duties of the country’s citizen. It guarantees the equality of each citizen and it prohibits racial discrimination and oppression. This chapter consists of 19 articles and it protects a citizen’s customs, habits and religious beliefs.

The last chapter, which is the fourth chapter, stipulates the national flag, the national emblem and the capital of PRC.

References

External links 
 The Constitution of the People's Republic of China (1954)
 The Constitution of the People's Republic of China (1954)
 The Constitution of the People's Republic of China (1954) from the Peking University Center for Legal Information

Constitution of the People's Republic of China
Constitution of the People's Republic of China
Constitution of China